Carlo Capra (21 September 1889, – 19 August 1966) was an Italian professional footballer who played as a defender.

International career
Capra made his only appearance for the Italy national football team on 31 January 1915 in a game against Switzerland.

Personal life
Capra's older brother Giovanni Capra also played football professionally. To distinguish them, Giovanni was referred to as Capra I and Carlo as Capra II.

External links
 

1889 births
1966 deaths
Italian footballers
Italy international footballers
Torino F.C. players
Aurora Pro Patria 1919 players
U.S. Alessandria Calcio 1912 players
Place of death missing
Association football defenders